DOCO, doco, or DoCo  may refer to:

 DoCo (pop group), an in-character band composed of voice actors from the Ranma ½ anime series
 Downtown Commons, an urban district in Sacramento, California sometimes referred to as “DoCo” 
 Martin "Doco" Doherty (1958–1994), Irish member of the Provisional Irish Republican Army
 DOCO, a chemical formula for the deuterated form of hydrocarboxyl
 An abbreviation for software documentation
 A slang term for a documentary film